Countless Branches is the sixth studio album by English musician Bill Fay. It was released on 17 January 2020 under Dead Oceans.

The album marks 50 years since Fay's debut self-titled album in 1970.

Critical reception

Countless Branches was met with acclaim from critics. Aggregator Album of the Year gave the album an 82 out of 100 based on 10 reviews from a critical consensus.

Track listing

Charts

References

2020 albums
Bill Fay albums
Dead Oceans albums